Sakol is a panchayat village in Shirur Anantpal Taluka in Latur subdivision of Latur district in the Indian state of Maharashtra. The village of Sakol is 12 km by road southeast of the village of Shirur Anantpal and 40 km by road northeast of the town of Nilanga.

The village of Sakol is the only village in the gram panchayat.

Demographics
In the 2001 Indian census, the village of Sakol recorded 7,018 inhabitants, of which  3,608 were males (51.4%) and 3,410 were females (48.6%), for a gender ratio of 945 females per 1000 males.

Notes

External links

Latur district
Villages in Latur district

Villages in Shirur Anantpal taluka